Hamilton Grange National Memorial, also known as The Grange or the Hamilton Grange Mansion, is a National Park Service site in St. Nicholas Park, Manhattan, New York City, that preserves the relocated home of U.S. Founding Father Alexander Hamilton. The mansion holds a restoration of the interior rooms and an interactive exhibit on the newly constructed ground floor for visitors. The Hamilton Heights subsection of Harlem derived its name from Hamilton's 32-acre estate there.

Origin

Alexander Hamilton was born and raised in the West Indies and came to New York in 1772 at age 17 to study at King's College (now Columbia University). During his career, Hamilton was a military officer, lawyer, member of the United States Constitutional Convention, American political philosopher, war hero, initiator and author of the majority of the pivotal and influential The Federalist Papers, and the first United States Secretary of the Treasury.

Hamilton commissioned architect John McComb Jr. to design a country home on Hamilton's  estate in upper Manhattan.  The two-story frame Federal style house was completed in 1802, just two years before Hamilton's death resulting from his duel with Aaron Burr on July 11, 1804. The estate was named "The Grange" after Hamilton's grandfather's own holdings in Scotland.  The Grange was the only home Hamilton ever owned, and he traveled there by stagecoach from his law office several times a week, and fussed over the landscaping, including a circle of thirteen sweet gum trees symbolizing the thirteen original states. The house remained in his family for 30 years after his death. The Grange might have also been Hamilton's rivalrous answer to Thomas Jefferson's Monticello.

First relocation

By 1889, much of the congregation of St. Luke's Episcopal Church in Greenwich Village had moved uptown. The Grange was in foreclosure and (since its northern corner partially extended into what would become the south side of 143rd Street between Amsterdam and Convent Avenues) had been condemned for destruction in order to allow for the implementation of the Manhattan street grid, then just reaching that area of Harlem.  The church acquired the house and moved it a half-block east and about two blocks south, conforming to the new street pattern, to what became 287 Convent Avenue. The original porches and other features were removed for the move. The interior staircase was reoriented and retrofitted to accommodate a makeshift entrance on the side of the house that faced the street, and the original grand Federal-style entrance was boarded up.

St. Luke's used the house for services and subsequently between 1892 and 1895 erected a Richardsonian Romanesque building on the site that wrapped around the house slightly; thus when a six-story apartment building was built in about 1910 flush on the opposite side, the house was tightly enclosed and many of its features hidden.  The American Scenic and Historic Preservation Society bought the Grange in 1924 and turned it into a public museum in 1933. Furniture and decorative objects associated with the Hamilton family were displayed.

The Grange was designated a National Historic Landmark in December 1960.  The private National Park Foundation purchased the house and property and transferred it to the National Park Service.  Congress authorized the National Memorial on April 27, 1962, requiring that it be relocated and then the house restored to appear as Hamilton knew it in 1802–1804, which is considered its period of historic significance. It was at the time determined that the claustrophobic Convent Avenue setting was inappropriate and that the country house should be viewed as a freestanding building. However, the house was not relocated earlier because of overwhelming local opposition to options offered that required moving it out of the neighborhood. The Grange was administratively listed on the National Register of Historic Places on October 15, 1966.

Second relocation

On May 9, 2006, the Hamilton Grange Memorial was closed to the public to allow for extensive architectural and structural investigations as part of a long-term plan to move the house to nearby St. Nicholas Park. The park location was judged a more appropriate setting for display that would permit restoration of features lost in the 1889 move. The new location would also keep the house in the neighborhood and within the boundary of Hamilton's original  estate.

Work in St. Nicholas Park for tree removal and foundation construction began in February 2008. The actual move of the Grange began with elevation of the building in one piece over the loggia of St. Luke's Church and onto Convent Avenue. Over several weeks it was gradually raised on hydraulic jacks, and more than 7,000 pieces of wood cribbing were inserted under the foundation. It was then moved on rollers along steel beams to wooden stilts of matching height erected in the middle of Convent Avenue, between West 141st and 142nd Streets, which held the entire house approximately ten feet off the ground while traffic was routed around it. These stilts were then slowly disassembled to leave the house resting on dollies, where it received interior bracing and was wrapped in two miles of chains. Finally on June 7, 2008, it completed its journey by being rolled one block south on Convent Avenue and then one block east on 141st Street (down a 6% grade) to the new St. Nicholas Park location. The New York Timess David W. Dunlap calculated its speed over the 500 feet at .04 mph. The six-hour event was a popular neighborhood attraction covered extensively in the press. The house was secured to its new foundation, original porches were rebuilt and the original main entrance doorway and main staircase within the entry foyer were restored using original materials recovered from elsewhere in the house. Landscaping around the Grange's new home includes among the tree plantings 13 sweet gum trees as in Hamilton's original garden, a stone wall, a circular rose garden planted in front to Hamilton's own specifications, and paths.

The Grange re-opened to the general public on September 17, 2011. A ceremony was held with Hamilton descendants in attendance and tours of the restored interiors took place through the day. In the renovated house, a visitor center is located in the entirely newly constructed ground floor, where the kitchen, laundry and servants' rooms would have been. The Grange now has a security detail and possible video monitoring during the evening hours. At its new location, it is next to the City College campus of the City University of New York.

See also
 List of national memorials of the United States

References

External links

Official NPS website: Hamilton Grange National Memorial
The National Parks: Index 2001–2003. Washington: U.S. Department of the Interior.
Hamilton Grange (Alexander Hamilton House) NHL information
Friends of St. Nicholas Park
Photo Gallery of Hamilton Grange National Memorial Second Relocation Project by Wolfe House & Building Movers
How Alexander Hamilton's House Got Moved on mentalfloss.com.

1962 establishments in New York City
Grange National Memorial
Biographical museums in New York City
Hamilton Heights, Manhattan
Harlem
Historic house museums in New York City
Houses completed in 1802
Houses in Manhattan
Houses on the National Register of Historic Places in Manhattan
John McComb Jr. buildings
Monuments and memorials on the National Register of Historic Places in New York (state)
Museums in Manhattan
National Historic Landmarks in Manhattan
National Memorials of the United States
National Park Service areas in New York (state)
National Park Service National Monuments in New York City
New York City Designated Landmarks in Manhattan
Protected areas established in 1962
Relocated buildings and structures in New York City
Relocated houses
Schuyler family residences
Tourist attractions in Manhattan
Homes of United States Founding Fathers